A Frank Exploration of Voyeurism and Violence was Kane Hodder's first EP. The album was released in 2004 on Suburban Home Records.

Track listing
 "Aboard The Leper Colony"
 "Simona Checks Betty's Corpse"
 "Attack On Tir Asleen" 
 "The Duke Has Died and Cancer Has Killed Him"
 "Queen of Suburban Legend"
 "David Lo Pan Versus Jack Burton"

External links
Last.fm page

2004 albums
Kane Hodder (band) albums